Brazuelo de Papayal is a town and municipality located in the Bolívar Department, northern Colombia.

References

External links

Municipalities of Bolívar Department